Jorabagan is a neighbourhood of North Kolkata, in Kolkata district, in the Indian state of West Bengal. As a neighbourhood, it covers a small area but its importance is primarily because of the police station.

Etymology 
Jorabagan, meaning ‘a pair of gardens’ in Bengali, was so named because the road through it led to the garden houses of Gobindram Mitter and  Umichand.

History 
Jorabagan is part of old Sutanuti. It is in this neighbourhood that Job Charnock made his famous landing at Sutanuti ghat in 1690. Mohunton's ghat between Beniatola and Shobhabazar ghats lurks the forgotten traditional landing place. There was a large tree under which Job Charnock is believed to have rested.

The Sabarna Roy Choudhury Paribar Parishad, and nine other intellectuals of the city filed a public interest litigation before the Kolkata High Court in 2001 demanding a probe into the matter whether Job Charnock can be regarded as the founder of Kolkata. The Court, upon an Expert Committee finding, declared that Job Charnock cannot be regarded as the founder of the city.

In 1888, one of the 25 newly organized police section houses was located in Jorabagan.

Geography 

Nimtala ghat in the neighbourhood is the burning ghat where Hindus cremate their dead. Amongst the more renowned people cremated there was Rabindranath Tagore and the place is marked with a memorial structure. Nimtala ghat now has an electric crematorium.

Police district
Jorabagan police station is part of the North and North Suburban division of Kolkata Police. It is located at 78, Nimtala Ghat Street, Kolkata-700006.

Amherst Street Women police station covers all police districts under the jurisdiction of the North and the North Suburban division i.e. Amherst Street, Jorabagan, Shyampukur, Cossipore, Chitpur, Sinthi, Burtolla and Tala.

Transport

Road
Jorabagan is surrounded by Strand Road on the west, Kali Krishna Tagore Street on the south, Rabindra Sarani on the east and Nimtala Ghat Street on the north. Baishab Seth Street-PK Tagore Street-Jadulal Mullick Road passes through the middle of the locality from north to south. Many buses and auto-rickshaws ply along these roads.

Train
Burra Bazar railway station on Kolkata Circular Railway line is the nearest railway station.

External links

References 

Neighbourhoods in Kolkata